Ian Bruce may refer to:

 Ian Bruce (athlete) (born 1935), Australian long jumper
 Ian Bruce (marketing) (born 1945), British vice-president, Royal National Institute for the Blind (RNIB)
 Ian Bruce (painter), painter and singer in the DJ/MC duo The Correspondents
 Ian Bruce (politician) (born 1947), British politician
 Ian Bruce (sailor) (1933–2016), Canadian Olympic sailor
 Ian Bruce (bowls), Scottish lawn bowler